Now, Diabolical is the sixth studio album by Norwegian black metal band Satyricon. It was released on 17 April 2006, through Roadrunner Records.

Album style
AllMusic wrote of the album's style: "Satyricon still get a lot of flack every time a new album is released that doesn't conform to the outdated, rustic-necro-kvlt brand of Norwegian black metal they played in the early '90s (alongside Darkthrone, Ulver, Enslaved, etc.) Their sixth full album, Now, Diabolical is no exception, and it hardly out-shocks its similarly unconventional predecessor, 2002's Volcano; [it] just brings the band's present mentality of addition by subtraction to its next logical step", describing, "[...] cuts like 'A New Enemy', 'That Darkness Shall Be Eternal' and the title track find the core duo of Satyr and Frost seeking simplicity above all else; consistently shunning complicated arrangements and overbearing displays of musicianship to exercise an almost industrial sense of discipline whilst executing their hypnotic riffs, sinister melodies and static tempos."

Blabbermouth.net opined, "Songs like the title track and 'K.I.N.G.' are all about the aforementioned groove. The driving rhythms and Satyr's vocal patterns are downright catchy. This is not about virtuosity or esoteric displays to prove an underground credibility. It is about hard driving tempos and head banging with a snarl on your face."

Release
On the vinyl version, as well as on the Scarecrow Records limited edition CD of the album, there is a bonus track, "Storm (Of the Destroyer)". Two singles were released from the album: "K.I.N.G." and "The Pentagram Burns"; both with videoclips.

Track listing

Personnel

Satyricon 

 Satyr – vocals, guitars, keyboards, horn arrangements
 Frost – drums

Session 

 Lars K. Norberg – bass
 John Woz (John Wozniak) – additional vocals on "A New Enemy"
 Øivind Westby – horn arrangements

Production 

 Satyr – production, special effects, art direction
 Erik Ljunggren – engineering, special effects
 Pytten – engineering
 Espen Berg – mastering
 Mike Fraser – mixing
 Per Heimly – photography
 Eric Mosher – engineering assistance
 Chris Samson – engineering
 Mike Cashin – engineering
 Ane Haugli – make-up on sleeve photos

Charts

References 

Satyricon (band) albums
2006 albums
Roadrunner Records albums